Mary Adelia Davis Treat (7 September 1830 in Trumansburg, New York – 11 April 1923 in Pembroke, New York) was a naturalist and correspondent with Charles Darwin. Treat's contributions to both botany and entomology were extensive—six species of plants and animals were named after her, including an amaryllis, Zephyranthes treatae, an oak gall wasp Bellonocnema treatae and three ant species Aphaenogaster mariae, Aphaenogaster treatae, and Dolichoderus mariae.

 Early life 
Born Mary Davis to a middle-class family in Trumansburg, New York, when she was nine years old, she moved with her family to Ohio, where she attended public and private girls' schools. Davis married Dr. Joseph Burrell Treat, an abolitionist and professor, in 1863; they lived in Iowa and in 1868 they moved to Vineland, New Jersey.

Career and research

After her move to New Jersey, Treat began her scientific studies in earnest, and collaborated with her husband on entomology articles and research. Treat’s first scientific article was a note published in The American Entomologist when she was 39 years old. Over 28 years she wrote 76 scientific and popular articles as well as five books. Her research quickly expanded from entomology to ornithology and botany, detailing bird and plant life in the southern New Jersey region and specifically the Pine Barrens. Following separation from her husband in 1874, Treat supported herself by publishing popular science articles for periodicals such as Harpers and Queen. Beginning in 1870, she published popular naturalist pieces in Garden and Forest, Hearth and Home, Harper's, and Lippincott's.

Her book, Injurious Insects of the Farm and Field, originally published in 1882, was reprinted five times. She also collected plants and insects for other researchers, one of whom was the eminent Harvard botanist Asa Gray. It was through Gray that she was introduced to Charles Darwin. Treat wrote letters to engage in botanical and entomological discourse not only with Darwin and Gray, but Auguste Forel and Gustav Mayr as well. She traveled to Florida several times between 1876 and 1878 to investigate insectivorous plants further. On one of these trips, she discovered the lily Zephyranthes treatae (named after her by Sereno Watson) and discovered that another lily was not extinct.

For her contributions to the field on entomology, Samuel Hubbard Scudder made Treat a member of the Cambridge Entomological Society.

 Collaboration with Charles Darwin 
The first recorded correspondence between Treat and Darwin originates from 20 December 1871 in which Treat describes the fly-catching activities of Drosera, commonly known as sundew plants. Treat and Darwin’s recorded correspondence extends over five years around the period of time when Darwin was researching, and then publishing, on carnivorous plants. They predominantly discuss these plants in their correspondence (although not the only theme, they also discussed controlling sex in butterflies), and Treat openly critiqued Darwin’s hypotheses. One notable exchange concerned the bladderwort plant, Utricularia clandestina.
Darwin’s teacher and mentor at Cambridge, John Stevens Henslow, had a clear understanding of the morphology of Utricularia (bladderwort) plants, but was not able to understand working mechanics of their traps. Darwin incorrectly concluded that animals entered the traps by forcing their heads through the slit-like orifice with their heads serving as a wedge. In a letter to Treat he informed her that this subject drove him ‘half-mad’. Treat became deeply absorbed in this problem, researching intensively. Through long hours of observing the trapping sequence under her microscope she realised that the hairs around the entrance to the trap were sensitive and part of the process by which Utricularia traps opened, contributing new knowledge on the range of microscopic animal prey caught in these traps and the digestive processes they were subjected to. Treat described it as ‘these little bladders... in truth like so many stomachs, digesting and assimilating animal food’. Darwin was so impressed with Treat’s work on carnivorous plants that he referenced her, both within the main text and in footnotes, throughout his publication Insectivorous Plants (1875).

By making such public affirmations of Treat’s scientific work, Darwin legitimized her role as a scientist, though this is not completely uncontested among historians . Gianquitto’s opinion is, however, not reflected by all writers discussing Treat’s scientific identity’. With the advent of the Internet, Treat's correspondence with Darwin has been analyzed in more detail.

Legacy

The best archive of Treat's life is available at the Vineland Historical and Antiquarian Society. In addition, the first full-length definitive biography of Treat, Mary Treat: A Biography by Deborah Boerner Ein, was published in 2022.

The Harvard University herbarium has a selection of Treat's specimens sent to Asa Gray and examples of their original correspondence. The original letters are, in the main, available to view through The Darwin Correspondence Project and at Cambridge University Library. 

The ant Aphaenogaster treatae was named after Treat by the Swiss entomologist Auguste Forel in honor of her discovery of ant specimens in Florida and New Jersey. Austrian entomologist Gustav Mayr named an oak fig root gall wasp (cynipid), Belonocnema treatae, in honor of Treat after she discovered it on a Virginia oak tree in Florida.

Mary Treat was fictionalized as one of the main characters in the 2018 historical novel Unsheltered, by the American writer Barbara Kingsolver, who took liberties in her portrayal of Treat and 19th century Vineland, New Jersey.

 Works 
Many of Treat's works detailed her observations of insects and birds in a style accessible to a popular audience.

 Chapters on Ants (1879)
 Injurious Insects of the Farm and Garden (1882)
 Home Studies in Nature (1885)
 Through a Microscope (1886)
 My Garden Pets (1887)
 Asa Gray: His Life and Work (1890)

See also
Timeline of women in science

Footnotes

References

Canning, K. (2006) Gender History in Practice: Historical Perspectives on Bodies, Class and Citizenship. Ithaca and London: Cornell University Press
Darwin, C. (1875) Insectivorous Plants London: John Murray
Gianquitto, T. (2003) Nobel Designs of Nature and Nation: God, science and sentiment in women’s representations of American landscape unpublished doctoral thesis Columbia University USA
Gianquitto, T. (2007) Good Observers of Nature: American Women and the Scientific Study of the Natural World Athens and London: The University of Georgia Press  
Norwood, V (1993). American Women and Nature: Made from this Earth. Chapel Hill and London: North Carolina University Press
Rossiter, M.W. (1982) Women Scientists in America: Struggles and Strategies to 1940. Baltimore: Johns Hopkins University Press
Treat, M. (1873) ‘Controlling Sex in Butterflies’. The American Naturalist, 7, 3 pp. 129–132
Treat, M. (1875) ‘Plants that eat animals’ Gardener’s Chronicle'', March, 6th pp. 303–304
Treat, M. (1882) Injurious Insects of the Farm and Field. New York: Orange Judd Company
Treat, M. (1885) Home studies in Nature. New York: American Book Company
Walters, M. (2001) Darwin’s Mentor: John Stevens Henslow 1796-1861 Cambridge and New York: Cambridge University Press

External links
 
 
Correspondence of Charles Darwin with Mary Treat from the Darwin Correspondence Project

1830 births
1923 deaths
American botanists
American entomologists
Women entomologists
American naturalists
19th-century American women scientists
American women botanists
Burials in New Jersey
People from Trumansburg, New York
People from Vineland, New Jersey
Scientists from New Jersey
Scientists from New York (state)
Women naturalists
American science writers
Women science writers